Scalptia crenifera is a species of sea snail, a marine gastropod mollusk in the family Cancellariidae, the nutmeg snails.

Description

Distribution
This marine species occurs off the Philippines.

References

 Hemmen, J. (2007). Recent Cancellariidae. Annotated and illustrated catalogue of Recent Cancellariidae. Privately published, Wiesbaden. 428 pp.
 Verhecken A. (2008). Cancellariidae. Pp. 816–825, in G.T. Poppe (ed.), Philippine marine mollusks, volume 2. Hackenheim: CoonchBooks.
 Verhecken A. (2011) The Cancellariidae of the Panglao Marine Biodiversity Project 2004 and the Panglao 2005 and Aurora 2007 deep sea cruises in the Philippines, with description of six new species (Neogastropoda, Cancellarioidea). Vita Malacologica 9: 1-60.

External links
 Sowerby, G. B. I. (1832–1833). Cancellaria. In: The Conchological Illustrations. London. Parts 9–13. 5 pls with explanations [pages and plates unnumbered + catalogue, 10 pp. [Parts 9–12, figs 1–35 (1832); Part 13, figs 36–44 and catalogue (1833)]

Cancellariidae
Gastropods described in 1832